Tattooed Heart is the third solo studio album by American country music artist Ronnie Dunn. The album was released on November 11, 2016 via Nash Icon Records. The album was originally scheduled for release on October 21, 2016.

The lead single from the album was "Ain't No Trucks in Texas". It was released to radio on July 17, 2015. The single charted at number 42 on the Billboard Country Airplay chart. The second single from the album, "Damn Drunk" (with Kix Brooks, one half of Brooks & Dunn) was released on August 5, 2016.  The third single from the album, "I Worship the Woman You Walked On", was released early 2017.

The album got its title from the Ariana Grande song of the same name. After his daughter played him the song, Dunn decided to record a cover for this album and selected it as the title track.

The album has sold 40,600 copies in the United States as of March 2017.

Track listing

Personnel
Adapted from liner notes.

Bob Bailey - background vocals (track 9)
Kix Brooks - featured vocals (track 2)
Tom Bukovac - electric guitar (track 1)
Joeie Canaday - bass guitar (tracks 2, 10, 11)
Dave Cohen - keyboards (all tracks except 9)
Perry Coleman - background vocals (tracks 3, 12)
Dorian Crozier - drums (track 1)
Chip Davis - background vocals (tracks 2, 4-6, 10, 11)
Jay DeMarcus - keyboards (tracks 1, 2, 4, 5, 11), piano (track 12), programming (tracks 1, 2, 5), string arrangements (track 3), string programming (track 3)
Dan Dugmore - steel guitar (1, 2, 10, 11)
Ronnie Dunn - lead vocals (all tracks)
Tabitha Fair - background vocals (track 7)
Jeneé Fleenor - fiddle (track 12)
Paul Franklin - steel guitar (tracks 3-7, 12)
Kenny Greenberg - electric guitar (track 8)
Vicki Hampton - background vocals (tracks 7, 9)
Mark Hill - bass guitar (track 1)
David Huff - programming (tracks 1, 2, 10-12)
Evan Hutchings - drums (all tracks except 1 & 9)
Charlie Judge - bass guitar (track 9), keyboards (track 9), programming (track 9), strings (track 9)
Kim Keyes - background vocals (track 7)
Mike Kyle - keyboards (track 9), sounds (track 9)
Neil Kyle - drums (track 9), chimes (track 9)
David LaBruyere - bass guitar (track 8)
Stuart Mathis - all guitars (track 9)
Reba McEntire - featured vocals (track 8)
Rob McNelley - electric guitar (tracks 1, 3-7, 12)
Gene Miller - background vocals (track 10)
Gary Morse - steel guitar (track 9)
Sean Neff - electric guitar (track 1)
Justin Ostrander - electric guitar (track 8)
Jon Randall - electric guitar (track 8)
Adam Shoenfeld - electric guitar (tracks 2, 8, 10, 11)
Jimmie Lee Sloas - bass guitar (tracks 3-7, 12)
Russell Terrell - background vocals (track 1)
Ilya Toshinsky - acoustic guitar (all tracks except 9), electric guitar (track 1), mandolin (track 1)
Derek Wells - electric guitar (tracks 3-7, 12)

Charts

References

2016 albums
Ronnie Dunn albums
Big Machine Records albums
Albums produced by Jay DeMarcus